Ulmu is a commune in the Rîbnița District of Transnistria, Moldova. It is composed of three villages: Lîsaia Gora (Лиса Гора, Лысая Гора), Ulmu and Ulmul Mic (Мала Ульма, Малая Ульма). It has since 1990 been administered as a part of the self-proclaimed Pridnestrovian Moldavian Republic (PMR).

References

Communes of Transnistria
Rîbnița District